Morgan Orlando Adams Jr. (August 30, 1915 – March 24, 2004) was an American sailor. He competed in the mixed 6 metres at the 1936 Summer Olympics.

References

External links
 

1915 births
2004 deaths
American male sailors (sport)
Olympic sailors of the United States
Sailors at the 1936 Summer Olympics – 6 Metre
Sportspeople from Pasadena, California